Semiembossed film is used as a liner to the calendared rubber to retain the properties of rubber and also to prevent dust and other foreign matters from sticking to the rubber while calendaring and during storage. It is manufactured with 100% virgin low-density polyethylene. The raw material is extruded and cast on the embossed roll and cooled. It can be of any color. Milky white, French blue, red and yellow are standard colors. The diamond-shaped embossing in the film helps in the easy removal of air between the film and the rubber. Semiembossed film is used by tyre manufacturers, tread and bonding gum manufacturers, conveyor belt manufacturers and other rubber coated fabric manufacturers.

Film embossing process
Film embossing is a mechanical process in which a flat film is transformed into an embossed product. During the process, thermal and stress fields are applied to the polymer, causing changes in the microstructure and physical dimensions of the material. The engineering analysis of the process requires the study of various aspects relating to the characterization of the microstructure before and after embossing, A variety of techniques were employed to characterize the properties and microstructure of the embossed film in relation to crystallinity, orientation, mechanical properties, and dimensions of the embossed films. The thermal treatment of the polymer film was shown to be the most significant factor in the process. By controlling the thermal treatment of the film, it is possible to manipulate the properties and dimensions of the embossed film. The important aspects: influencing thermal treatment include the radiation heater temperature, preheat roll temperature, line velocity, and film thickness. The initial film orientation and embossing pressure have a minor effect on the final properties of the embossed film. The main effect of the embossing pressure is on the bulk thickness of the embossed film.

Rubber